Wahlenbergia multicaulis is a small herbaceous plant in the family Campanulaceae native to Australia (all states except Queensland and the Northern Territory). 

It blooms between September and February producing blue flowers.

In Western Australia, the species is found on the edges of swamps and creek beds and on hillsides in the Wheatbelt and South West regions where it grows in sandy-loamy-clay soils over granite or laterite.

References

multicaulis
Eudicots of Western Australia
Plants described in 1837
Endemic flora of Western Australia